Liam's Story is a television spin-off of the children television series The Dumping Ground. It is a 10 part web-series that was made available on The Dumping Ground website after series 2, episode 3 had aired and continued being released up to episode 12. The webisodes were also aired on CBBC Channel as a 28-minute story on 23 March 2014.

Cast
Liam O'Donovan - played by Richard Wisker
Jack O’Donovan - played by Chris Finch
Poppy Ho - played by Shorelle Hepkin
PA - played by Jade Byrne
Stevie - played by Dean Bone
Dave - played by Drew Horsley
Engineer - played by Adam Henderson Scott
Mo Michaels - played by Reece Buttery

Episodes

Webisodes (2014)

Television (2014)

References

External links
 

2010s British children's television series
2014 British television series debuts
2014 British television series endings
BBC children's television shows
British television spin-offs
The Story of Tracy Beaker
The Dumping Ground
Tracy Beaker series
Television series about teenagers